Mario Kummer (born 6 May 1962) is a retired track and road racing cyclist from East Germany, who represented his native country at the 1988 Summer Olympics in Seoul, South Korea. There he won the gold medal in the men's team time trial, alongside Uwe Ampler, Jan Schur and Maik Landsmann. He was a professional road cyclist from 1990 to 1998, and afterwards became a cycling manager, managing  for the 2007 racing year.

Major results

1983
Troféu Joaquim Agostinho
1st Stages 1 & 6
1st Stage 8 Okolo Slovenska
10th Overall Tour de l'Avenir
1984
1st  Overall Tour de Normandie
1988
1st  Team time trial, Summer Olympics (with Uwe Ampler, Jan Schur and Maik Landsmann)
1989
10th Overall Circuit Cycliste Sarthe
1990
3rd Firenze–Pistoia
10th Overall GP du Midi-Libre
1991
1st Stage 3 Giro di Puglia
8th Firenze–Pistoia
1994
8th Japan Cup Cycle Road Race
1997
5th HEW Cyclassics

References

External links

1962 births
Living people
People from Suhl
People from Bezirk Suhl
East German male cyclists
German male cyclists
German track cyclists
Cyclists at the 1988 Summer Olympics
Olympic cyclists of East Germany
Olympic gold medalists for East Germany
Olympic medalists in cycling
Cyclists from Thuringia
UCI Road World Champions (elite men)
Medalists at the 1988 Summer Olympics
Recipients of the Patriotic Order of Merit in gold